Trust for America's Health (TFAH) is a Washington, D.C.-based health policy organization. The organization's website calls the group "a non-profit, non-partisan organization dedicated to saving lives by protecting the health of every community and working to make disease prevention a national priority."

TFAH policy reports focus on public health policy topics such as obesity, food safety, pandemic flu preparations, bioterrorism and emergency preparedness.

The board of directors includes Lowell P. Weicker, Jr., former U.S. Senator and Governor of Connecticut.

Healthier America Project
The purpose of the Healthier America Project is to address gaps in the nation's health protection system. More than 150 health experts and organizations were convened to identify ways to effectively modernize the public health system. The Project includes the Blueprint for a Healthier America: Modernizing the Federal Public Health System to Focus on Prevention and Preparedness.

Pandemic flu
Flu pandemics occur three to four times each century, and experts predict that a new pandemic influenza outbreak is inevitable. The group estimates that a severe pandemic flu outbreak could result in up to 1.9 million deaths, approximately 9.9 million new hospital patients, and an economic recession with losses of over $680 billion to the U.S. Gross Domestic Product.

TFAH issued a series of reports on pandemic flu and created the Working Group on Pandemic Influenza Preparedness with more than 40 other organizations. They also created a series of brochures for families, medical providers, businesses, and community leaders who want to learn more about how to prepare for a possible pandemic.

Food safety
Approximately 76 million Americans – one in four – are sickened by foodborne diseases each year.

The TFAH report, Fixing Food Safety: Protecting America's Food Supply from Farm-to-Fork, outlines a plan to reallocate resources and restructure bureaucracy to keep America's food supply more secure.

Obesity
Adult obesity rates have doubled since 1980, from 15 to 30 percent, while childhood obesity rates have more than tripled.

TFAH issues its annual report, F as in Fat: How Obesity Policies Are Failing in America, to track obesity trends and policies. The group recommends that a National Strategy to Combat Obesity be created with roles for individuals, families, communities, schools, employers, businesses, insurers, and government.

Bioterrorism and public health preparedness
TFAH publishes an annual report on public health preparedness called, Ready or Not? Protecting the Public's Health from Diseases, Disasters and Bioterrorism, which examines America's ability to respond to health threats and help identify areas of vulnerability. TFAH also offers a series of recommendations to further strengthen America's emergency preparedness.

In the 2017 report, TFAH concluded that the reduction in federal and state funding for public health over the past 15 years has left many states unprepared to respond to bioterrorism, outbreaks of infectious diseases and natural disasters. The report uses 10 "key indicators" to measure the public health preparedness of each state. For 2017, 25 states received a score of 5 or lower. Nineteen out of 50 states increased public health funding during the 2017 fiscal year. Additionally, at the federal level public health funding has been cut in half since 2002, the report found.

Emerging infectious diseases
According to a National Intelligence Estimate, "newly emerging and re-emerging infectious diseases, many of which are likely to continue to originate overseas, will continue to kill at least 170,000 Americans annually."

In Germs Go Global: Why Emerging Infectious Diseases Are a Threat to America, TFAH concludes that these diseases have real consequences for the nation's public health system, delivery of medical care, economy, and national security.

References

External links
Official website

Medical and health organizations based in Washington, D.C.
Non-profit organizations based in Washington, D.C.